William James Monilaw (July 22, 1874 – July 18, 1964) was an American football coach and college athletics administrator.  He served at the head football coach at Drake University from 1903 to 1904 and at the University of Missouri from 1906 to 1908, compiling a career college football record of 28–13–1.  Every year he coached, his teams posted a winning record.

Early life
Molinaw attended Cedar Rapids High School in Cedar Rapids, Iowa and was later accepted into Drake University.

Coaching career

Drake
Monilaw got his first coaching job as the seventh head coach for his alma mater, Drake University, for two seasons, from 1903 until 1904.  His coaching record at Drake was 10–7.

Missouri
From 1906 to 1908, he served as the head football coach at the University of Missouri in Columbia, Missouri, where he compiled an 18–6–1 record.  Monilaw was the 12th head coach for Mizzou.

Head coaching record

References

External links
 

1874 births
1964 deaths
Drake Bulldogs athletic directors
Drake Bulldogs football coaches
Drake Bulldogs football players
Missouri Tigers athletic directors
Missouri Tigers football coaches